Kostolište is a village in Malacky District in the Bratislava Region of western Slovakia close to the town of Malacky, north-west of Slovakia's capital Bratislava.

Names and etymology
The name comes from German Kirchplatz, Kirchenplatz (1423 Kirchle, 1488 Kyryhporcz, 1561 Kripoletz, etc.).).  Older Slovak name Krýpolec, Kiripolec (the official name 1920–1948) is a phonetic adaptation. In 1948, the village was renamed to Kostolište by translation of the German name.

Famous people
Martin Benka, painter

Genealogical resources

The records for genealogical research are available at the state archive "Statny Archiv in Bratislava, Slovakia"

 Roman Catholic church records (births/marriages/deaths): 1870-1895 (parish B)

See also
 List of municipalities and towns in Slovakia

References

External links

 Official page
https://web.archive.org/web/20090412234949/http://www.statistics.sk/mosmis/eng/run.html
Surnames of living people in Kostoliste

Villages and municipalities in Malacky District